Respa or RESPA may refer to:
Real Estate Settlement Procedures Act
Respa (person), an early leader of the Goths